Butyl bromide (C4H9Br) may refer to:

 1-Bromobutane (n-Butyl bromide)
 2-Bromobutane (sec-butyl bromide)
 1-Bromo-2-methylpropane (isobutyl bromide)
 2-Bromo-2-methylpropane (tert-butyl bromide)